Shivanand Tiwari (born 1943) is a prominent politician from Bhojpur district, Bihar who was a member and an officer of the Janata Dal (United) political party, which he represented in the Rajya Sabha. First he was a prominent leader and spokesperson of Lalu Prasad Yadav's Rashtriya Janata Dal party. Later he was the General Secretary and spokesman for the JD (U). On 27 February 2014 he was denied renomination to Rajya Sabha, and expelled from the Nitish's Janata faction along with four other  Lok Sabha members of the party. After his stint with Nitish's Janata Dal (U), he re-joined Lalu Prasad Yadav's RJD.

Posts held 
, Tiwari has held the following posts:

 1996 - Member, Bihar Legislative Assembly from Shahpur- Janata Dal.
 2000 - Member, Bihar Legislative Assembly (second term) from Shahpur - RJD.
 2000-2005 Cabinet Minister for Excise and Prohibition, Government of Bihar.
2005 - Won Feb 2005 Legislative Assembly election from Shahpur, lost the Oct 2005 elections from the same seat on RJD ticket.
 May 2008 to April 2014 - Member, Rajya Sabha from JD(U).
 Joint Parliamentary Committee on Wakf
 August 2008 - Member, Committee on Finance and Member, Consultative Committee for the Ministry of Home Affairs.

Also see
List of politicians from Bihar

References 

1943 births
Living people
Bihar MLAs 1995–2000
People from Bhojpur district, India
Janata Dal (United) politicians
Rajya Sabha members from Bihar
Bihar MLAs 2000–2005
Rashtriya Janata Dal politicians
Bihari politicians